The Trials of Gabriel Fernandez is a 2020 American true crime documentary television series about the 2013 murder and abuse of Gabriel Fernandez, an eight-year-old boy from Palmdale, California. It was released on Netflix as a six-part miniseries on February 26, 2020.

Cast 
 Rodrigo Alfonso as Arturo Martinez
 William Guirola as Isauro Aguirre

Background 
Directed by documentary filmmaker Brian Knappenberger, the series is co-produced by his production company, Luminant Media, and Common Sense Media. The series features interviews with Los Angeles Times journalists, attorneys Jon Hatami and Scott Andrew Yang, Los Angeles County District Attorney Jackie Lacey, and others.

Knappenberger has stated that, during the two years of production on the series, producers kept a therapist on call because of the disturbing nature of the content.

Critical response 
The Trials of Gabriel Fernandez has received generally positive reviews from critics. Writing for CNN.com, Brian Lowry called the series "compelling but structurally messy". Writing for Decider, Joel Keller called the series "a must-watch".

See also 
 List of Netflix original programming

References

External links

2020 American television series debuts
2020 American television series endings
2020s American documentary television series
Netflix original documentary television series
Documentaries about child abuse
Documentary television series about crime in the United States
English-language Netflix original programming